Quéant is a commune in the Pas-de-Calais department in the Hauts-de-France region of France.

Geography
Quéant Mountain is a mountain in Canada named after the town.

Population

Places of interest
 The church of St.Leger, rebuilt after destruction in the First World War.
 The Quéant Road Cemetery, overseen by the Commonwealth War Graves Commission.

See also
Communes of the Pas-de-Calais department
Battle of Drocourt-Quéant Line (1918)

References

External links

 CWGC.org, The CWGC extension to the communal cemetery

Communes of Pas-de-Calais